is a Japanese Shinto Shrine in Hiroshima, Japan.

Overview
The original shrine was founded in 1869, the first year of the Meiji period, in  Hiroshima. The shrine was established to mourn the Hiroshima-Han victims of the Boshin War.

In 1934, it was dismantled and moved to where Hiroshima Municipal Stadium now stands, and in 1939 its name was changed to the Hiroshima Gokoku Shrine.

In 1945, it was destroyed by the atomic bombing, and was rebuilt within the confines of Hiroshima Castle in 1965 with the aid of donations from the citizens of Hiroshima.

The Hiroshima Gokoku Shrine is one of the most popular places for celebrating Hatsumōde and Shichi-Go-San in Hiroshima.

See also 
Boshin War
Atomic bombings of Hiroshima and Nagasaki
Hiroshima Castle
Japanese Shinto Shrine
Hatsumōde
Shichi-Go-San
Hiroshima Toyo Carp

Notes

External links 

Hiroshima Gokoku Shrine(in Japanese)

Shinto shrines in Hiroshima Prefecture
Gokoku
Tourist attractions in Hiroshima
Rebuilt buildings and structures in Japan
Gokoku shrines

Beppyo shrines